The Société civile des Producteurs de Phonogrammes en France (SPPF)  is a rights management company for music producers, similar to the Société civile des producteurs phonographiques. According to GfK, its catalog represented 23.3% of physical sales and 31% of streaming in France in 2018.

References

External links 
 

Companies of France